The Women's madison competition at the 2019 UCI Track Cycling World Championships was held on 2 March 2019.

Results
The race was started at 17:38. 120 km were raced with 12 sprints.

References

Women's madison
2019